Andriy Savenets Mykolayovych (born on 5 September 1977 in Cornyn, Zhytomyr) is a Ukrainian poet, translator, literary critic, Associate Professor of Humanities and Economic Academy (Lodz, Poland).

Biography 
Andriy Savenets Mykolayovych was born on September 5, 1977, in the village Kornyn in Zhytomyr region in a family of teachers, philologists, which determined the subsequent life choices. In 1994, he graduated Kornyn secondary school No. 1, then he joined the Faculty of Zhytomyr Ivan Franko State University, where he studied until 1999, specializing in " Ukrainian language and literature and English and foreign literature ". In 1995 he made his debut as a writer in a Poetry Contest "Hranoslov" in Zhytomyr. He is a member of the Association of Ukrainian Writers since 1997 and member of the National Union of Writers of Ukraine since 2000. During the period of residence in Zhytomyr, he took an active part in the activities of Community organizations - Ukrainian Youth Association, the Association of Youth Movement and the Association of Independent Journalists.

As a student, he worked in the editorial offices of periodicals in Zhytomyr, such as "Express Afisha" and "Saturday" ("Subota"), then worked in the editorial of weeklies "Viche" and "Free Word" («Vilne Slovo»), he served there as a pagemaker, columnist, literary editor. After graduating the institute, he worked in Bilkivsk secondary school in Zhytomyr (1999-2000), and later taught English in Ivan Ogiienko school of culture and arts. In 2000-2001 he worked at the Department of Ukrainian literature in the Zhytomyr Ivan Franko State University. In 2001, based on the research project received a scholarship at the European College of Polish and Ukrainian Universities in Lublin (Poland), where he studied until 2005, and within a short time worked in this school. In parallel, he studied at the postgraduate studies in the John Paul II Catholic University of Lublin, where in 2005 defended his thesis "Poetry in the prism of translation: poems Wislava Shymborska in Ukrainian language." Since 2006 he has been working as an associate professor in the Academy of Humanities and Economics in Lodz, moreover, teaches at the John Paul II Catholic University of Lublin and in the Paderewski Private Schools in Lublin. Savenets Andriy is an active member of the Ukrainian Society in Lublin, where lives with his wife Jaroslava. They have a son Markiyan and daughter Sofia.

Works 
He is the author of poetry collections «Introspecto» (Zhytomyr, 1996) and "The symbol sigma" (Zhytomyr, 1998). In 1996-1998 he participated in the publication of literary and art periodical "Avzhesh!", where he published his own poetry, prose, literary- critical articles and translations of American poetry. He was also publishing poetry in the pages of magazines "Suchasnist`", "Svitovyd", "Thursday" ("Chetver"). The author of the monograph "Poetry in Translation:" Ukrainian "Szymborska" (Lublin Zhytomir, 2006) and author of a number of literary, literary criticism and translated articles in journals, textbooks and scientific collections.

Translation activity 
Andrew Savenets considers his greatest hobby, vocation and mission - translation Polish and English poetry. In his Ukrainian translations he published some poems of famous writers like Shakespeare, Robert Frost, Emily Dickinson, Jim Morrison, L. Hughes, literary critiques A. Vincenz and Lobodowsky, and letters of Jerzy Giedroyc. His translations of poems by Wislawa Szymborska were published special editions,  such as «Wersja wydarzeń = Version of events" (Lublin, 2005) and «Może to wszystko = Maybe it is" (2011) and also "Poem of Lublin" Jozef Czechowicz (Lublin, 2005).

Resources 
Translated biography about Andriy Savenets
Translated biography about Andriy Savenets №2

Notes 
Creole identity in the poems of anglophone Caribbean-born authors

Ukrainian poets
Ukrainian translators
1977 births
Living people